Ancheta is a surname. Notable people with the surname include:

Atilio Ancheta (born 1948), Uruguayan soccer player
Emiliano Ancheta (born 1999), Uruguayan soccer player 
Isidro Ancheta (1882–1946), Filipino landscape painter
Nelson Mauricio Ancheta (born 1963), Salvadoran soccer player and manager
Steve Ancheta (born 1969), American soccer player